The Mercedes 37/95 was an early touring car first built in 1910–11 as the 37/90 and produced commercially from 1913 as the 37/95. It had a massive Daimler four cylinder 9.5 litre engine generating 90–95 horsepower, which provided power to the rear wheels by chain drive allowing the car to reach 71 mph (115 km/h).

Racing 
The 37/95 won a number of races, including the Elgin Trophy and the Vanderbilt Cup. The car was known for some time as the most powerful car in the world.

References 

Daimler Motoren Gesellschaft
Cars introduced in 1913